Spinney Mountain State Park is a Colorado state park located in South Park in Park County, Colorado, United States.
 
The park centers on the Spinney Mountain Reservoir, which is popular with anglers. The reservoir and surrounding land is owned by the City of Aurora, Colorado, which uses the reservoir for municipal water storage. The park itself is managed by Colorado Parks and Wildlife.

Fishing
Spinney Mountain Reservoir provides great fishing for rainbow trout and northern pike, and sometimes brown trout as well. The park closes for the winter when the reservoir freezes over and opens around mid-April.

Name
The park takes its name from nearby Spinney Mountain, elevation .

References

External links
 Official park website

State parks of Colorado
Protected areas of Park County, Colorado
Protected areas established in 1987
1987 establishments in Colorado